Dawn Moe (born 1952) is a South African former cricketer who played as a right-handed batter and right-arm off break bowler. She appeared in three Test matches for South Africa in 1972, all against New Zealand, scoring 108 runs and taking one wicket. She played domestic cricket for Natal.

References

External links
 
 

1952 births
Living people
South African women cricketers
South Africa women Test cricketers
KwaZulu-Natal Coastal women cricketers